The Municipal Council is the legislative branch of government for Newark, New Jersey.

Newark was governed by a mayor and common council from 1836 to 1917 and then by a five-member commission until 1954.

Effective as of July 1, 1954, the voters of the city of Newark, by a referendum held on November 3, 1953 and under the Optional Municipal Charter Law (commonly known as the Faulkner Act), adopted the Faulkner Act (Mayor-Council) Plan C as the form of local government.

There are nine council members elected on a nonpartisan basis at the regular municipal election or at the general election for terms of four years: one council member from each of five wards and four council members on an at-large basis. The mayor is also elected for a term of four years.

Municipal elections in Newark are nonpartisan and are held on the second Tuesday in May. A council candidate seeking a post in a ward must receive more than 50 percent of the vote. If a candidate does not receive a majority, a run-off election is held with the two candidates with the greatest number of votes.

Council members choose their own President and until 2014, when the position was eliminated, Vice President.

Members
As of July 01, 2022 council members were:

LaMonica R. McIver (Council President/Council Member, Central Ward)
C. Lawrence Crump (Council Member-at-Large)
Patrick O. Council (Council Member, South Ward)
Carlos M. Gonzalez (Council Member-at-Large)
Dupré L. Kelly (Council Member, West Ward)
Luis A. Quintana (Council Member-at-Large)
Anibal Ramos, Jr. (Council Member, North Ward)
Louise Scott-Rountree (Council Member-at-Large)
Michael J. Silva (Council Member, East Ward)

Mayor

The mayor may cast a tie-breaking vote on the municipal council when there is an equal number of yes and no votes. The Mayor can also call for meetings of the council outside those regularly scheduled.

The Newark mayoral election took place May 13, 2014 and was won by Ras Baraka.
Luis A. Quintana had stepped down as Council President to be sworn in as mayor on November 4, 2013 following the resignation of Cory Booker, completing the term which ended June 30, 2014.
Baraka also won the 2018 election.

Council members since 1954

Council Presidents

John A. Brady, 1954–1958
Michael A. Bontempo, 1958–1962
Ralph A. Villani, 1962–1970
Louis Turco, 1970–1973
Frank G. Megaro, 1973–1974
Earl Harris, 1974–1982
Ralph T. Grant, Jr., 1982–1986
Henry Martinez, 1986–1990
Ralph T. Grant, Jr., 1990–1991
Donald Tucker, 1991–1992
Donald Bradley, 1992–1993
Gary Harris, 1993–1994
Donald Bradley, 1994–2006
Mildred C. Crump, 2006–2010, 2013–2021
Donald M. Payne Jr., 2010–2012
Luis A. Quintana, 2013, 2021–2022
LaMonica R. McIver, 2022-

Council Vice President

Luis A. Quintana, 2006–2010, 2018–2021
Anibal Ramos, Jr., 2010-2013
Augusto Amador, 2013–2014 
Position temporarily eliminated late 2014 – May 2015.
Augusto Amador 2015–2018
LaMonica R. McIver, 2021–2022
Position Eliminated, 2022

Council Members At-Large

Michael A. Bontempo, 1954–1966, 1970–1974
John A. Brady, 1954–1966
James T. Callaghan, 1954–1962, 1966–1968
Jack Waldor, 1954–1958
Raymond V. Santoro, 1958–1962
Anna Santoro, 1962
Anthony Giuliano, 1962–1968
Ralph A. Villani, 1962–1973
Leon Ewing, 1968
Anthony J. Giuliano, 1968–1978
Anthony Imperiale, 1968–1970
Calvin D. West, 1966–1970
Sharpe James, 1982–1986
Earl Harris, 1970–1982, 1986–1988
Marie L. Villani, 1973–1993
Ralph T. Grant, Jr. 1978–1994
Gary Harris, 1988–1995
Gayle Chaneyfield Jenkins, 1995–2006
Mildred C. Crump, 1994–1998, 2006–2021
Donald K. Tucker, 1974–2005
Luis A. Quintana, 1994–2013, 2014–
Bessie Walker, 1998–2006
Ras Baraka, 2005–2006
Carlos M. Gonzalez 2006–
Donald M. Payne, Jr., 2006–2012
Eddie Osborne, 2014–2022
C. Lawrence Crump, 2021–
Louise Scott-Rountree, 2022-

North Ward Council Members
Mario V. Farco, 1954–1958
Joseph V. Melillo, 1958–1970
Frank G. Megaro, 1970–1974
Anthony Carrino, 1974–2002
Hector M. Corchado, 2002–2006
Anibal Ramos, Jr., 2006-

East Ward Council Members
Phillip Gordon, 1954–1968
Louis Turco, 1968–1974
Finney J. Alati 1974
Henry Martinez, 1974–1998
Augusto Amador, 1998–2022
Michael J. Silva, 2022-

West Ward Council Members
M. Joseph  Gallagher, 1954–1958
Frank Addonizio, 1958–1970
Michael P. Bottone, 1970–1982
Ronald L. Rice, 1982–1998
Mamie Bridgeforth, 1998–2006
Ronald C. Rice, 2006–2014
Joseph A. McCallum Jr., 2014-2022
Dupré L. Kelly, 2022-

South Ward Council Members
Samuel Cooper, 1954–1957
Sophie Cooper, 1957–1962
Lee Bernstein, 1962–1969
Horace P. Sharper, 1969–1970
Sharpe James, 1970–1982
Donald M. Payne Sr., 1982–1989
Donald Bradley, 1989–2006
Oscar S. James, II, 2006–2010
Ras Baraka, 2010–2014
John Sharpe James, 2014-2022
Patrick O. Council, 2022-

Central Ward Council Members
Irvine I Turner, 1954–1970
Dennis Westbrooks, 1970–1974
Jesse Allen, 1974–1978
Benjamin F. Johnson, III, 1978–1982
George Branch, 1982–1998
Cory Booker, 1998–2002
Charles A. Bell, 2002–2006, 2008–2010
Dana Rone, 2006–2008
Darrin S. Sharif, 2010–2014
Gayle Chaneyfield Jenkins, 2014–2018
LaMonica R. McIver, 2018-

References

Elected officials
Government of Newark, New Jersey
City councils in the United States